Nesbit is an unincorporated community in Dunklin County, in the U.S. state of Missouri.

History
A post office called Nesbit was established in 1887, and remained in operation until 1905. A local merchant named the community after the Nesbit, McKay and Company.

References

Unincorporated communities in Dunklin County, Missouri
Unincorporated communities in Missouri